Hungary competed as the host nation at the 2017 World Aquatics Championships in Budapest, Hungary from 14 July to 30 July.

Medalists

Diving

Hungary has entered 5 divers (three male and two female).

Men

Women

Open water swimming

Hungary has entered eight open water swimmers

Men

Women

Mixed

Swimming

Hungarian swimmers have achieved qualifying standards in the following events (up to a maximum of 2 swimmers in each event at the A-standard entry time, and 1 at the B-standard):

Men

Women

Mixed

Synchronized swimming

Hungary's synchronized swimming team consisted of 12 athletes (12 female).

Women

 Legend: (R) = Reserve Athlete

Water polo

Men's tournament

Team roster

Viktor Nagy
Béla Török
Krisztián Manhercz
Gergő Zalánki
Márton Vámos
Norbert Hosnyánszky
Ádám Decker
Miklós Gór-Nagy
Balázs Erdélyi
Dénes Varga (C)
Tamás Mezei
Balázs Hárai
Attila Decker

Group play

Quarterfinals

Semifinals

Final

Women's tournament

Team roster

Edina Gangl
Dóra Czigány
Dóra Antal
Gréta Gurisatti
Gabriella Szűcs
Orsolya Takács
Anna Illés
Rita Keszthelyi (C)
Ildikó Tóth
Barbara Bujka
Dóra Csabai
Dorottya Szilágyi
Orsolya Kasó

Group play

Quarterfinals

5th–8th place semifinals

Fifth place game

References

Nations at the 2017 World Aquatics Championships
Hungary at the World Aquatics Championships
2017 in Hungarian sport